is a live video album by Japanese singer/songwriter Yōko Oginome, released on March 25, 2015, through Victor Entertainment on Blu-ray + DVD. The video covers Oginome's concert at Akasaka Blitz on October 16, 2014 during the Dear Pop Singer tour as part of her 30th anniversary celebration.

The album peaked at No. 92 on Oricon's Blu-ray chart.

Track listing

Charts

References

External links
 
  

2015 video albums
Yōko Oginome albums
Live video albums
Japanese-language video albums
Victor Entertainment live albums
Albums recorded at Akasaka Blitz